The International Land-Sea Center is a 98 storey,  tall mixed use skyscraper under construction in Chongqing, China. The tower is the main building for the Chongqing International Trade and Commerce Center, an 11 tower development that is the centerpiece of the 3.6 million-square-meter Chongqing Tian Di Master Plan, a major redevelopment of a downtown core area in Chongqing. The tower's design is inspired by the sailing ships that once crowded the waters of the surrounding Yangtze and Jialing Rivers. Upon completion it will become the tallest building in Chongqing, and one of the tallest buildings in China.

History 
The Chongqing International Trade and Commerce Center was first proposed in 2007 with construction eventually starting in 2012. However, in 2016 the construction slowed dramatically. In late 2019, construction eventually ramped up and the main tower topped out in July 2022. The complex is slated for completion in 2023-24 and will feature office, residential, retail, and entertainment space to bring energy, activity, and value to the site.

See also
 List of tallest buildings in the world
 List of tallest buildings in Chongqing

References

Buildings and structures under construction in China
Skyscraper office buildings in Chongqing
Skyscraper hotels in Chongqing
Skyscrapers in Chongqing